The Little Sheep Run Fast is a 1940 Australian play by Sumner Locke Elliott.

References

External links
The Little Sheep Run Fast at Ausstage

Australian plays
1940 plays